Puso sa Puso is a 1988 Filipino romantic drama film directed by Emmanuel H. Borlaza and starring Sheryl Cruz, Romnick Sarmenta, Helen Vela, Ricky Belmonte, Liza Lorena, Perla Bautista, Cesar Montano, Jaime Castillo, Jennifer Sevilla, and Eddie Garcia. Produced by Seiko Films, the film was released on May 25, 1988. Critic Lav Diaz gave the film a mildly positive review.

Cast
Sheryl Cruz as Rosel
Romnick Sarmenta as Daniel
Helen Vela as Wilma, Daniel's mother
Ricky Belmonte as Rosel's father
Liza Lorena as Luisa, Rosel's mother
Perla Bautista
Cesar Montano as Noel
Jaime Castillo
Jennifer Sevilla
Eddie Garcia as Daniel's grandfather
Janet Giron
Don Pepot
Metring David
Renato del Prado
Romeo Enriquez
Fred Moro
Michelle Christian
Eva Ramos

Release
Puso sa Puso was released on May 25, 1988, and became a box office success.

Critical response
Lav Diaz, writing for the Manila Standard, gave Puso sa Puso a mildly positive review. Although he found the film's story of a romance between a rich girl and a poor boy to be clichéd ("gasgas") even with the various turns its plot takes, Diaz stated that "thank goodness we were saved by singing, dancing and zombies in this film. Whew."

References

External links

1988 films
1988 romance films
1988 romantic drama films
Filipino-language films
Philippine romance films
Philippine teen drama films
Philippine teen romance films
Seiko Films films